Emilio Fagot (2 February 1883 – 28 January 1946) was a Puerto Rican politician and Mayor of Ponce, Puerto Rico, from 1 January 1929 to 1 January 1933.

Early years
Fagot was born in Ponce on 2 February 1883 into a family of farmers.

Career
Fagot became interested in politics at a young age and by 1914 (age 30) he was a member of the Ponce Municipal Assembly. He also founded a new political party: Partido Popular Ponceño. Through his party he formed a coalition between the Socialist and Republican parties that led him to winning the 1928 elections and become mayor of Ponce in 1929.

Presidential visit
Emilio Fagot is best known for his welcoming and hosting of US President Herbert Hoover in 1933, during the time of the Great Depression. He has the distinction of being one of three Ponce mayors to have hosted a US President.

Death and legacy
Fagot died on 28 January 1946. In Ponce there is a major thoroughfare named after him.

See also
Ponce, Puerto Rico
List of Puerto Ricans

References

Further reading
 Fay Fowlie de Flores. Ponce, Perla del Sur: Una Bibliográfica Anotada. Second Edition. 1997. Ponce, Puerto Rico: Universidad de Puerto Rico en Ponce. p. 332. Item 1656. 
 Municipio de Ponce. Exposicion publica a los contribuyentes y a todos los vecinos de la Ciudad de Ponce, sobre la situación económica del Municipio y sobre el estado general de todas sus dependencias y servicios, al terminar su gestión administrativa el Alcalde saliente don Guillermo Vivas Valdivieso, en enero 14 de 1929, fecha en que se hicieron cargo de la administración municipal los actuales funcionarios electos por la voluntad soberana del pueblo. San Juan, Puerto Rico: Cantero, Fernandez & Co. 1929. (Pontificia Universidad Católica de Puerto Rico)

Mayors of Ponce, Puerto Rico
1946 deaths
1883 births
20th-century American politicians